Rockin Bethlehem: The Second Coming is a 1990 compilation album, following on from Rockin' Bethlehem It featured 14 christmas songs recorded by independent Australian bands. It was created by Timberyard Records to support the Camperdown Children's Hospital. It received a 1991 ARIA Award nomination for Best Independent Release.

Track listing
 Screaming Tribesmen – Santa's Little Helper 	
 Rum Babas – Christmas Sweeps Away Another Year 	
 Ape The Cry – Funny World 	
 Painters and Dockers – Merry Christmas, Carol 	
 Rob Craw – When It's Christmas Time 	
 Falling Joys – Little Drummer Boy	
 Dom Mariani's Orange – Christmasonic 	
 Archie Roach & Paul Kelly – Christmas Eve 	
 Psychotic Turnbuckles – Psychotic Christmas 	
 Hellmenn – Sock It To Me Santa 	
 Lost Boys – Guiding Star 	
 The Healers – Six White Boomers 	
 Stu Spasm's Bubble Machine – Ho Ho Ho 	
 Celibate Rifles – Merry Xmas Blues

References

1990 compilation albums